Kabouter (Dutch) – Little people that live underground, in mushrooms, or as house spirits
 Kachina (Hopi and Puebloan) – Nature spirit
 Kahaku (Japanese) – Little people and water spirits
 Kajsa (Scandinavian) – Wind spirit
 Kalakeyas (Hindu) – Descendants of Kala
 Kallikantzaroi (Greek) – Grotesque, malevolent spirit
 Kamaitachi (Japanese) – Wind spirit
 Kamatayan (Philippine) – Philippine counterpart of Death
 Kami (Japanese) – Nature spirit
 Kamikiri (Japanese) – Hair-cutting spirit
 Kanbari-nyūdō (Japanese) – Bathroom spirit
 Kangla Sha (Meitei mythology) – Dragon Lion in the Kangla Palace
 Kanbo (Japanese) – Drought spirit
 Kanedama (Japanese) – Money spirit
 Kappa (Japanese) – Little people and water spirit
 Kapre (Philippine) – Malevolent tree spirit
 Karakoncolos (Bulgarian and Turkish), also in Bosnia and Herzegovina and Serbia known as Karanđoloz – Troublesome spirit
 Karakura (Turkish) – Male night-demon
 Karasu-tengu (Japanese) – Tengu with a bird's bill
 Karkadann (Persian) – One-horned giant animal
 Karkinos (Greek) – Giant crab
 Karura (Japanese) – Eagle-human hybrid
 Karzełek (Polish) – Little people and mine spirits
 Kasa-obake (Japanese) – Animated parasol
 Kasha (Japanese) – Cat-like demon which descends from the sky and carries away corpses
 Kashanbo (Japanese) – Kappa who climb into the mountains for the winter
 Katawa-guruma (Japanese) – Woman riding on a flaming wheel
 Katsura-otoko (Japanese) – Handsome man from the moon
 Katallan (Albanian) – Man-eating giant 
 Kaukas (Lithuanian) – Nature spirit
 Kawa-uso (Japanese) – Supernatural river otter
 Kawa-zaru (Japanese) – Smelly, cowardly water spirit
 Kayeri (Cuiva) - Mushroom-like monster
 Ke'lets (Chukchi mythology) – Ogre or evil spirit
 Keelut (Inuit) – Hairless dog
 Kee-wakw (Abenaki) – Half-human half-animal cannibalistic giant
 Kekkai (Japanese) – Amorphous afterbirth spirit
 Kelpie (Irish and Scottish) – Malevolent water horse
 Ker (Greek) – Female death spirit
 Kesaran-pasaran (Japanese) – Mysterious, white, fluffy creature
 Keukegen (Japanese) – Disease spirit
 Keythong (Heraldic) – Wingless griffin
 Colchis bull (Greek) – Bronze-hoofed bulls
 Khyah (Nepalese) – Fat, hairy ape-like creature
 Kigatilik (Inuit) – Night-demon
 Kholomodumo (Sotho) – Gluttonous monster that was one of the first beasts of creation
 Kijimunaa (Japanese) – Tree sprite from Okinawa
 Kijo (Japanese) – She-devil
 Kikimora (Slavic) – Female house spirit
 Killmoulis (English and Scottish) – Ugly, mischievous mill spirit
 Kinnara (Hindu) – Human-bird hybrid
 Kin-u (Japanese) – Bird
 Kirin (Japanese) – Japanese Unicorn
 Kishi (Angola) – Malevolent, two-faced seducer
 Kitsune (Japanese) – Fox spirit
 Kitsune-Tsuki (Japanese) – Person possessed by a fox spirit
 Kiyohime (Japanese) – Woman who transformed into a serpentine demon out of the rage of unrequited love
 Klabautermann (German) – Ship spirit
 Knocker (folklore) (Cornish and Welsh) – Little people and mine spirits
 Knucker (English) – Water dragon
 Kobalos (Greek) – Goblin like thieves and tricksters
 Kobold (German) – Little people and mine or house spirits
 Kodama (Japanese) – Tree spirit
 Kofewalt (Germanic) – House spirit
 Ko-gok (Abenaki) – Hideous monster
 Kokakuchō (Japanese) – Ubume bird
 Komainu (Japanese) – Protective animal
 Konaki-jiji (Japanese) – Infant that cries until it is picked up, then increases its weight and crushes its victim
 Konoha-tengu (Japanese) – Bird-like creature
 Koro-pok-guru (Ainu) – Little people
 Korrigan (Breton) – Little people and nature spirits
 Kraken (Scandinavian) – Sea monster
 Krasnoludek (Slavic) – Little people nature spirits
 Krasue (Southeast Asian) – Vampiric, floating head
 Krampus (Germany) – Christmas Devil who punishes badly-behaved children 
 Kuarahy Jára (Guaraní) – Forest spirit
 Kubikajiri (Japanese) – Female corpse-chewing graveyard spirit
 Kuchisake-onna (Japanese) – Vengeful ghost of a woman mutilated by her husband
 Kuda-gitsune (Japanese) – Miniature fox spirit
 Kudan (Japanese) – Human-faced calf which predicts a calamity before dying
 Kui (Chinese) – One-legged monster
 Kukudhi (Albanian) – Female demon who spreads sickness
 Kukwes (Mi'kmaq) – Large, hairy, greedy, human-eating bipedal monsters whose scream can kill
 Kulshedra (Albanian) – Drought-causing dragon
 Kumakatok (Philippine) – Death spirits
 Kumiho (Korean) – Fox spirit
 Kun (Chinese) – Giant fish
 Kupua (Hawaiian) – Shapeshifting tricksters
 Kurabokko (Japanese) – Guardian spirit of a warehouse
 Kurage-no-hinotama (Japanese) – Jellyfish which floats through the air as a fireball
 Kurma (Hindu mythology) – Second avatar of Vishnu in the form of a Turtle
 Kurupi (Guaraní) – Wild man and fertility spirit
 Kushtaka (Tlingit) – Shapeshifting "land otter man"
 Kye-ryong (Korean) – Chicken-lizard hybrid
 Kyourinrin (Japanese) – Animated scroll or paper
 Kyūbi-no-kitsune (Japanese) – Nine-tailed fox
 Kyūketsuki (Japanese) – Vampire

K